Edward Owen Kayvan Temple-Morris (born 26 April 1965 in Cardiff) is a British DJ, record producer and TV presenter. He hosted London radio station XFM's specialist show The Remix for 15 years, before moving it to Soho Radio. He joined Virgin Radio UK in 2017 and currently presents mid-mornings on weekdays.

Biography
Before joining XFM, Temple-Morris was the main presenter on the MTV show Up for It Live, presented shows for Atlantic 252 & BBC Hereford & Worcester, co-presented the Pepsi Chart on Five, and Takeover TV on Channel 4.

He hosted The Remix on Friday nights from 10pm till 2am. The strapline for the show is "where dance rocks", and includes dance remixes of indie and rock hits, plus up and coming dance music of the dance rock crossover variety. Most weeks there is also a 30-minute mix from a guest DJ, producer or artist called the "Superchunk" and now "The All Time Top 10" where remixers create a 10-minute mix featuring the artist's favorite songs, this has become a competition with mixes featuring over 200 songs. The show, which was co-presented/produced by James Hyman (1999–2003) popularized the mashup genre, with a section called Bedroom Bedlam dedicated to unofficial bootleg remixes. Many established names in the mash up scene, including Go Home Productions, Freelance Hellraiser, and Osymyso, got some of their earliest plays on the Remix Show. Also, Kasabian, 2ManyDJs, Simian Mobile Disco, Reverend and the Makers, Infadels, Plan B and Justice received their first ever air play on the show. His last show aired on 4 September 2015.

Temple-Morris DJs at rock, electro and indie crossover nights in UK and Europe, supporting the Prodigy, Pendulum and Delays in their UK tours. His own night, The Remix All Nighter, took place at London super-nightclub, Matter. Remix Night events take place elsewhere in the UK. In 2007, Temple-Morris headlined a Remix Night UK tour.

On the production side Temple-Morris remixes with Tom Bellamy from the Cooper Temple Clause under the moniker Losers. Some of their remixes appeared on a new double album, compiled and mixed by Temple-Morris, called Dance Rocks, which was released in April 2007 on UK label Botchit & Scarper. More recently Losers have remixed Gossip, Rage Against the Machine, the Presets and Placebo. Losers released their album 'Beautiful Losers' on Gung Ho! Recordings on 13 September 2010.

Temple-Morris co-founded Manumission's Ibiza Rocks. He also programmed stages at the UK's Glade, Secret Garden Run to the Sun, The Big Snow and The Big Reunion music festivals.

Temple-Morris writes a weekly column for music industry website CMU, called Eddy Says.

He is the voice of motor racing magazine show Mobil 1 The Grid, shown on Channel 4 and Motors TV in the UK, and Speed in North America.

Temple-Morris agreed to become Ambassador for The British Tinnitus Association in January 2010, to help raise money and awareness for the hearing condition which he has suffered from for a decade.

He is the son of the late Labour peer and former Conservative MP Peter Temple-Morris and was educated at Malvern College in Malvern, Worcestershire.

In 2017, he joined digital radio station Virgin Radio UK presenting weekend drivetime. In January 2018, he began presenting the weekday mid-morning show replacing Jamie East alongside his new Saturday afternoon show.

References

External links 
 Eddy Says column in the CMU Daily.
 
 NME feature on Eddy Temple Morris at the NME.com.

1965 births
Welsh DJs
British record producers
British radio personalities
British radio DJs
People educated at Malvern College
Mass media people from Cardiff
Living people
British people of Iranian descent
Sons of life peers
Virgin Radio (UK)
Welsh people of Iranian descent